Malacocephalus laevis is a species of fish belonging to the family Macrouridae.

It has cosmopolitan distribution.

References

Macrouridae
Fish described in 1843